Pondera County is a county in the U.S. state of Montana. As of the 2020 census, the population was 5,898. Its county seat is Conrad.

Geography

Adjacent counties

 Glacier County – north
 Toole County – north
 Liberty County – east
 Chouteau County – east
 Teton County – south
 Flathead County – west

National protected area
 Lewis and Clark National Forest (part)
 Rocky Mountain Front Conservation Area (part)

Demographics

2000 census
As of the 2000 United States census there were 6,424 people, 2,410 households, and 1,740 families in the county. The population density was 4 people per square mile (2/km2). There were 2,834 housing units at an average density of 2 per square mile (1/km2). The racial makeup of the county was 83.66% White, 0.09% Black or African American, 14.46% Native American, 0.14% Asian, 0.05% Pacific Islander, 0.12% from other races, and 1.48% from two or more races. 0.84% of the population were Hispanic or Latino of any race. 24.1% were of German, 13.8% Norwegian, 8.3% Irish, 5.7% American and 5.1% English ancestry. 92.0% spoke English, 5.1% German and 1.8% Blackfoot as their first language.

There were 2,410 households, out of which 35.30% had children under the age of 18 living with them, 60.00% were married couples living together, 8.40% had a female householder with no husband present, and 27.80% were non-families. 25.50% of all households were made up of individuals, and 12.30% had someone living alone who was 65 years of age or older. The average household size was 2.63 and the average family size was 3.18.

The county population contained 29.60% under the age of 18, 6.40% from 18 to 24, 24.80% from 25 to 44, 22.90% from 45 to 64, and 16.30% who were 65 years of age or older. The median age was 39 years. For every 100 females there were 97.40 males. For every 100 females age 18 and over, there were 95.40 males.

The median income for a household in the county was $30,464, and the median income for a family was $36,484. Males had a median income of $27,125 versus $19,314 for females. The per capita income for the county was $14,276. About 15.00% of families and 18.80% of the population were below the poverty line, including 23.40% of those under age 18 and 8.30% of those age 65 or over.

2010 census
As of the 2010 United States census, there were 6,153 people, 2,285 households, and 1,528 families residing in the county. The racial makeup of the county was 82.7% white, 14.5% American Indian, 0.2% Asian, 0.1% black or African American, 0.2% from other races, and 2.4% from two or more races. Those of Hispanic or Latino origin made up 1.4% of the population. In terms of ancestry, 31.9% were German, 14.7% were Norwegian, 13.2% were Irish, 9.3% were English, 5.7% were Dutch, and 5.6% were American.

Of the 2,285 households, 30.0% had children under the age of 18 living with them, 53.3% were married couples living together, 9.4% had a female householder with no husband present, 33.1% were non-families, and 29.9% of all households were made up of individuals. The average household size was 2.41 and the average family size was 3.01. The median age was 42.8 years.

The median income for a household in the county was $36,419 and the median income for a family was $47,656. Males had a median income of $34,259 versus $26,903 for females. The per capita income for the county was $18,989. About 14.9% of families and 21.5% of the population were below the poverty line, including 32.5% of those under age 18 and 10.7% of those age 65 or over.

Politics
From its creation until 1964, voters of Pondera County were fairly balanced; they selected Democratic Party candidates in 58% of national elections. Since 1964, the Republican presidential candidate has garnered the county's vote in every election.

Communities

City
 Conrad (county seat)

Town
 Valier

Census-designated places

 Birch Creek Colony
 Brady
 Dupuyer
 Heart Butte
 Kingsbury Colony
 Midway Colony
 New Miami Colony
 Pondera Colony

Other unincorporated communities

 East Community
 Fowler
 Gallup City
 Ledger
 Manson
 Williams

Notable people
 Ivan Doig, author; resided in Dupuyer
 George Montgomery – film/television actor; born and raised in Brady

See also
 List of lakes in Pondera County, Montana
 List of mountains in Pondera County, Montana
 National Register of Historic Places listings in Pondera County MT

References

External links
 County website

 
1919 establishments in Montana
Populated places established in 1919